is a sub-kilometer asteroid and near-Earth object of the Apollo group, at least  in diameter.  It was first observed on 3 January 2016, by the WISE telescope with precovery images found back in 2012.

The potentially hazardous asteroid is a binary system with a minor-planet moon in its orbit. The discovery was made by astronomers at Arecibo Observatory on 4 January 2019, while  was passing within  of the Earth. The binary has a secondary-to-primary diameter ratio of at least 0.3.

Orbit and classification 

 orbits the Sun at a distance of 0.85–1.8 AU once every 18 months (554 days; semi-major axis of 1.32 AU). Its orbit has an eccentricity of 0.36 and an inclination of 6° with respect to the ecliptic. The body's observation arc begins with a precovery taken at the Siding Spring Survey in July 2012, more than three years prior to its official discovery observation.

References

External links 
 MPEC 2016-A161: Daily Orbit Update, K16A08Z, 15 January 2016
 List of the Potentially Hazardous Asteroids (PHAs), Minor Planet Center
 
 
 

Minor planet object articles (unnumbered)

20160103